The play-offs of the 2013 Fed Cup Europe/Africa Zone Group II were the final stages of the Group II zonal competition involving teams from Europe and Africa. Using the positions determined in their pools, the seven teams faced off to determine their placing in the 2014 Fed Cup Europe/Africa Zone Group II. The top two teams advanced to Group I, and the bottom two teams were relegated down to the Group III for the next year.

Promotional play-offs 
The first-placed teams of each pool played against the second-placed teams of the other pool in head-to-head rounds. The winner of each round advanced to the 2015 Europe/Africa Zone Group I.

Liechtenstein vs. Bosnia and Herzegovina

Finland vs. Georgia

Relegation play-offs 
The third-placed teams of each pool played against the fourth-placed teams of the other pool in head-to-head rounds. The loser of each round was relegated to the 2015 Europe/Africa Zone Group III.

Lithuania vs. Egypt

Montenegro vs. South Africa

Final placements 

References

External links 
 Fed Cup website

P2